The 2019–20 season is Raja Casablanca's 71st season in existence and the club's 63nd consecutive season in the top flight of Moroccan football. They competing in Botola, the Throne Cup, CAF Champions League and Arab Club Champions Cup. The season started on 14 September 2019, and was scheduled to end on 1 July 2020. However, the season was suspended in March 2020, due to COVID-19 pandemic in Morocco, then resumed in July and ended in 11 October 2020.

Squad list
Players and squad numbers last updated on 31 August 2019.Note: Flags indicate national team as has been defined under FIFA eligibility rules. Players may hold more than one non-FIFA nationality.

Pre-season and friendlies

Competitions

Overview

{| class="wikitable" style="text-align: center"
|-
!rowspan=2|Competition
!colspan=8|Record
!rowspan=2|Started round
!rowspan=2|Final position / round
!rowspan=2|First match
!rowspan=2|Last match
|-
!
!
!
!
!
!
!
!
|-
| Botola

| 
| style="background:gold;"|Winners
| 24 October 2019
| 11 October 2020
|-
| Throne Cup

| colspan=2|Round of 32
| colspan=2|31 August 2019
|-
| CAF Champions League

| Preliminary round
| Semi-finals
| 10 August 2019
| 4 November 2020
|-
| Arab Club Champions Cup

| First round
| Semi-finals
| 23 September 2019
| 16 February 2020
|-
! Total

Botola

League table

Results summary

Result round by round

Matches

Moroccan Throne Cup

Champions League

Qualifying rounds

In the qualifying rounds, each tie will be played on a home-and-away two-legged basis. If the aggregate score will be tied after the second leg, the away goals rule was applied, and if still tied, extra time will not be played, and the penalty shoot-out will be used to determine the winner (Regulations III. 13 & 14).

Preliminary round

First round

Group stage

Group D

knockout stage

Following the quarter-finals, due to the COVID-19 pandemic in Africa, the semi-finals, originally scheduled for 1–2 May (first legs) and 8–9 May (second legs), were postponed indefinitely on 11 April 2020, and the final, originally scheduled for 29 May, was also postponed on 18 April 2020. On 30 June 2020, the CAF Executive Committee proposed that the competition would resume with a Final Four format played as single matches in a host country to be decided. However, these plans were later halted after the Cameroonian Football Federation withdrew from hosting the Final Four, and the CAF decided against hosting it in either Egypt or Morocco in the principle of fairness. On 3 August 2020, the CAF announced that the competition would resume in its original format with the semi-finals played on 25–26 September (first legs) and 2–3 October (second legs), and the final played on 16 or 17 October. On 10 September 2020, the CAF announced that at the request of the Royal Moroccan Football Federation, the semi-finals were rescheduled to 17–18 October (first legs) and 23–24 October (second legs), and the final to 6 November. On 22 October 2020, the CAF announced that the semi-final second leg between Zamalek and Raja Casablanca, originally scheduled to be played on 24 October, was postponed to 1 November, due to Raja Casablanca being required by Moroccan authorities to self-isolate until 27 October after eight players testing positive for the COVID-19 virus, with the total number of cases increasing to fourteen the following day. On 30 October 2020, the CAF announced that this match was further postponed to 4 November, the final postponed to 27 November.

Quarter-finals

Semi-finals

Arab Club Champions Cup

First round

Second round

Quarter-finals

Semi-finals
The tournament was postponed for ten months in 2020 due to COVID-19 pandemic, and the final was played on 21 August 2021, where Raja Casablanca defeated Al-Ittihad Jeddah on penalties after a 4–4 draw to earn their second title.

Squad information

Playing statistics

|-
! colspan=16 style=background:#dcdcdc; text-align:center| Goalkeepers

|-
! colspan=16 style=background:#dcdcdc; text-align:center| Defenders

|-
! colspan=16 style=background:#dcdcdc; text-align:center| Midfielders

|-
! colspan=16 style=background:#dcdcdc; text-align:center| Forwards

|-
! colspan=16 style=background:#dcdcdc; text-align:center| Players transferred out during the season

Goalscorers
Includes all competitive matches. The list is sorted alphabetically by surname when total goals are equal.

Transfers

In

Out

Notes

References

Raja CA seasons
Raja CA